Jackie Jacobson (born Tuktoyaktuk, Northwest Territories) is a Canadian politician, who represents the electoral district of Nunakput in the Legislative Assembly of the Northwest Territories.

Political career
Jacobson began his political career as mayor of Tuktoyaktuk. During his tenure he was forced to deal with problems caused by erosion of the coast line and damage to the community from the Beaufort Sea.

Jacobson ran as a candidate in the Nunakput electoral district in the 2007 Northwest Territories general election. He defeated incumbent Calvin Pokiak and two other candidates with 42% of the vote to win his first term in office. He served as Speaker of the legislature from 2011 to 2015.

He was defeated in the 2015 election by Herbert Nakimayak, but defeated Nakimayak in the 2019 election to reclaim the seat.

References

External links
Jackie Jacobson Legislature biography

Members of the Legislative Assembly of the Northwest Territories
Living people
Mayors of places in the Northwest Territories
21st-century Canadian politicians
Year of birth missing (living people)
Speakers of the Legislative Assembly of the Northwest Territories